The 1984 Texas–Arlington Mavericks football team was an American football team that represented the University of Texas at Arlington in the Southland Conference during the 1984 NCAA Division I-AA football season. In their first year under head coach Chuck Curtis, the team compiled a 7–4 record.

Schedule

References

Texas–Arlington
Texas–Arlington Mavericks football seasons
Texas–Arlington Mavericks football